Hawken is a Nordic-based forename but is also a surname. It may also refer to:

 Hawken rifle, a type of muzzleloading rifle from the 19th century
 Hawken School, an independent, coeducational, college preparatory day school in Northeast Ohio, USA
 Hawken (video game), a multiplayer mech combat video game developed by Reloaded Games